Piz Gren is a mountain of the Swiss Lepontine Alps, located between Tenigerbad and Lumbrein in the canton of Graubünden. Its summit lies near the tripoint between Val Sumvitg, Val Gronda, and Val Miedra.

References

External links
 Piz Gren on Hikr

Mountains of Switzerland
Mountains of Graubünden
Mountains of the Alps
Lepontine Alps
Two-thousanders of Switzerland
Lumnezia
Sumvitg